"Red Fraction" is the first single of I've Sound singer Mell and her first single under Geneon Entertainment. Currently, this is Mell's most successful single as it reached #11 in the Oricon charts and sold a total of 38,006 copies. It was featured in the opening credits of the 2006 japanese anime series Black Lagoon, produced by Madhouse and directed by Sunao Katabuchi.

Track listing
Red Fraction—3:42
Composition: Kazuya Takase
Arrangement: Kazuya Takase
Lyrics: Mell
Red Fraction (instrumental) – 3:41
Red Fraction (G.M.S remix) – 6:02
Composition: Kazuya Takase
Arrangement: G.M.S
Lyrics: Mell

References

2006 singles
Mell songs
Song recordings produced by I've Sound
2006 songs